Michael F. Korn is an American author who writes horror and science fiction. He has written eleven novels and his stories have appeared in over 220 magazines worldwide. He lives in Louisiana.

Bibliography
All the Mutant Trash in All the Galaxies (TBA)
The White Trash Witches' Coven / Pavane For a Scream Queen. (2004)
Confessions of a Ghoul and Other Stories (2001)
Aliens, Minibikes and Other Staples of Suburbia (2001)
Skimming the Gumbo Nuclear (2001)
Rachmaninoff's Ghost (1985)

External links
M. F. Korn's homepage
Bibliography at SciFan

Year of birth missing (living people)
Living people
21st-century American novelists
American horror writers
American male novelists
American science fiction writers
Novelists from Louisiana
American male short story writers
21st-century American short story writers
21st-century American male writers